Stefano Surdanovic (born 23 November 1998) is an Austrian professional footballer who plays for Austria Lustenau.

Club career
He made his Austrian Football First League debut for SV Ried on 21 July 2017 in a game against SC Wiener Neustadt.

On 3 February 2022, Surdanovic signed with Admira Wacker.

Personal life
Born in Austria, Surdanovic is of Serbian descent and holds a Serbian passport.

References

External links
 

1998 births
People from Wels
Living people
Austrian footballers
Austrian people of Serbian descent
SV Ried players
FC Blau-Weiß Linz players
FC Admira Wacker Mödling players
SC Austria Lustenau players
2. Liga (Austria) players
Austrian Football Bundesliga players
Association football forwards